Emmanuel Lutheran Church of Harlemville and Cemetery is a historic Lutheran church and cemetery at County 21 and Pheasant Lane, Harlemville Road at Ten Broeck Road in Harlemville, Columbia County, New York.  The church was built 1871–1873 and is a one-story, rectangular wood-frame building with clapboard siding and a gable roof. It features a square bell tower and is set on a fieldstone foundation.  The cemetery holds about 200 burials and is still in use.

It was listed on the National Register of Historic Places in 2002.

References

Lutheran churches in New York (state)
Churches on the National Register of Historic Places in New York (state)
Churches completed in 1873
19th-century Lutheran churches in the United States
Lutheran cemeteries in the United States
Cemeteries on the National Register of Historic Places in New York (state)
Cemeteries in Columbia County, New York
Churches in Columbia County, New York
National Register of Historic Places in Columbia County, New York